The NABI BRT was a line of low-floor transit buses available in 60' articulated (60-BRT) and later 42' rigid (42-BRT) nominal lengths manufactured by North American Bus Industries (NABI) between 2004 and 2015. In addition to the different available lengths, the buses were sold with a variety of prime movers, ranging from conventional diesel and CNG combustion engines to diesel-electric hybrid.

The NABI BRT was styled to resemble a light-rail vehicle for service on bus rapid transit lines, joining the existing NABI LFW and NABI CompoBus product lines. After New Flyer acquired NABI in 2013, all NABI product lines were discontinued in 2015, once existing orders for NABI buses had been fulfilled.

Design

The NABI 60-BRT was designed in response to a Los Angeles County Metropolitan Transportation Authority (LACMTA) request for proposal for the rolling stock on its forthcoming Orange Line (now G Line), which specified a vehicle that was "sleek, streamlined, and aerodynamic", carried three extra-wide doors to facilitate faster boarding, and were less noisy (78 dBA) than typical transit buses. 

The NABI 60-BRT bus NABI designed for the contract was announced in 2003, and production started in 2004. A pilot vehicle was delivered in fall 2004 for a two-month trial, and the first 28 60-BRTs (which MTA called 'Metro Liners') were delivered in June 2005. 

Like prior NABI buses, body shells were assembled in Hungary and shipped to the NABI plant in Anniston, Alabama for finishing until body production was shifted to Anniston gradually starting in 2011; by late 2012, the transition was complete.

NABI introduced by a similarly styled 42-foot rigid bus in 2006. LACMTA was  the first customer for this model, as well, followed by LA World Airport's "FlyAway" service and Foothill Transit over the following year.

A single 65-foot model (65-BRT) was built and sold to LACMTA. The extended 65-BRT (nicknamed 'Longfellow') was introduced to service in September 2007 and required a special permit from CalTrans; to keep its weight similar to the 60-BRT, it only carries 8 CNG tanks as opposed to the 60-BRT's 12.

On the stamped vehicle identification plate, the vehicle type is identified as xxBRT.nn, where xx gives the nominal length (in feet) and nn is the sequentially-assigned order number, starting from 01.

Hybrid
Six model 42-BRT buses delivered to LACMTA in 2008 used a unique "Thundervolt" gasoline-electric hybrid powertrain from ISE Corporation. The system proved to be unreliable and after ISE went bankrupt in 2010, LACMTA was unable to get support for the system. The buses were eventually repowered. 

The largest user of hybrid NABI BRT buses was WMATA, who placed an order in July 2013 for 105 diesel-electric hybrid 42-BRT buses. These buses used a more reliable combination of a Cummins L9 engine mated with the Allison Transmission H 40 hybrid system which is coupled to the engine in lieu of a conventional transmission.

Deployment
The first NABI 60-BRT buses were delivered to LACMTA in October 2004; LACMTA was also the first customer for the 42-BRT, delivered in 2008. The final NABI BRT buses to be built were completed in 2015: the 60-BRT for Transfort, serving Fort Collins, Colorado and the 42-BRT for Massport, serving Logan Airport in Boston. The NABI factory in Anniston was then retooled to produce New Flyer Xcelsior low-floor buses for the United States transit market.

Most of the BRT production was for the 60-BRT model. LACMTA was the largest customer, with almost 400 60-BRTs delivered. The seat fabric for LACMTA's fleet of Metro 45C CompoBus and 60-BRT Metro Liners was designed by Beep'Inc., a collaboration of artist Pae White and architect Tom Marble.

Competition
 Gillig Low Floor
 New Flyer Xcelsior
 Nova Bus LF Series
 Orion VII

References

External links

 
 
 

Buses of the United States
Vehicles introduced in 2004
Articulated buses